Waldemar Zausz (born 5 March 1952) is a Polish judoka. He competed in the men's heavyweight event at the 1976 Summer Olympics.

References

1952 births
Living people
Polish male judoka
Olympic judoka of Poland
Judoka at the 1976 Summer Olympics
Sportspeople from Wrocław